Mustaqbil Pakistan (MP) is a political party founded in 2010 by a group of politicians looking to bring about a change in politics in Pakistan. The main emphasis of the party is to bring people of  competence, integrity, and honesty into Pakistani politics. The founders of the party allege that all of Pakistan's travails - poverty, corruption, terrorism, sectarian violence and lawlessness - are due to a single root cause: that the people who are now in Pakistan's politics do not have the necessary competence, integrity, honesty and even desire to run the country.

Chairman, National Executive Committee, & Presidents 

The party's first Chairman is Nadeem Mumtaz Qureshi, an engineer by training and a fluent Arabic speaker. He is also one of the founding members of the party as well as one of 6 members of the party's national executive committee. The other members of the committee include Moeen Qureshi, Waqar Haider Bokhari, Unsia Bano, Dawoodi Morkas, and Sheheryar Ali.

Activity 
MP's presence has 12 offices in 3 provinces of the country. The party has over 10,000 registered members and over 170,000 supporters and well-wishers on social media. The party has seen large expansion and hopes to participate in the 2018 general elections. Special attention is being given to remote areas of the country such as the mountainous north of the country where the party recently opened an office in Swat. Volunteers and members have increased in large numbers since the formation of the party. Today MP has more than 11,000 registered members and thousands of volunteers across Pakistan.  The Central office is in Multan and the other branch office is in Athara Hazari.

Women 
MP includes a female lawyers wing which advocates for women's rights.

Flag 
The blue color represents the horizon, sky, flight, vastness, and the world.

The white color represents peace, clarity, and brightness.

The triangle of white is a stars corner derived from the Pakistani Flag.

National Party Song 
The national song of the party, titled Waqt ki Azaan, Mustaqbil Pakistan, was written by Naveed Ansari, in time for the 2013 elections in which Mustaqbil Pakistan participated. Another song written for the party is entitled Mustaqbil Pakistan Ka Tum He Toh Ho.

Elections 
The 2013 elections included 22 candidates from MP, 18 for the Provincial Assembly and 5 for the National Assembly.

In general elections of 2018, the Chairman, Nadeem Mumtaz Qureshi contested for NA-114 and NA-156 national assembly and a further 10 candidates contested for both national and provincial assemblies.

The party issued tickets to only those who fulfilled and qualified MP's criteria. Following are the names and constituencies.

1.       Nadeem Mumtaz Qureshi            NA – 156

2.       Muhammad Atif Imran                  NA – 155

3.       Nadeem Mumtaz Qureshi            NA – 114

4.       Sher Muhammad Gondal              NA – 85

5.       Syed Usman Ali                                PP – 125

6.       Muhammad Umar Shafi                PP – 130

7.       Muhammad Yousuf Ansari            PP – 215

8.       Muhammad Rafiq Chohan             PP – 220

9.       Muhammad Shahid                         PP – 223

10.   Muhammad Sajid Thaim                 PP – 269

References

External links 

Political parties in Pakistan
Political parties established in 2010
2010 establishments in Pakistan